Nilda Mabel Carrizo (born 13 January 1979) is an Argentine teacher and politician, currently serving as National Deputy elected in Tucumán Province. A member of the Justicialist Party and La Cámpora, Carrizo previously served in the Chamber from 2013 to 2017. She currently sits in the Frente de Todos bloc.

Early and personal life
Carrizo was born on 13 January 1979 in Buenos Aires. She studied to be a primary teacher at the Instituto de Enseñanza Superior in Famaillá, Tucumán. Carrizo is married to Jesús Salim, a fellow Justicialist Party politician who was a provincial legislator in Tucumán. Salim and Carrizo have two children.

Political career
Carrizo's political career began as an activist in La Cámpora, a kirchnerist youth organization. She was also a member of the Justialist Party Youth council. Before being elected to office, she was an administrative worker at the Superintendencia de Riesgo del Trabajo (SRT), Argentina's labour work risk assessment agency. In the 2013 legislative election, Carrizo ran in the Front for Victory list in Tucumán as the third candidate, behind (then) Health Minister Juan Manzur and Osvaldo Jaldo. The list received 46.94% of the vote, not enough for Carrizo to make it past the D'Hondt cut; however, Manzur never took office, as he remained in his position as Health Minister, and Carrizo was sworn in as deputy in his stead.

Carrizo's term ended in 2021, and she did not stand for re-election. She would run again in 2019, this time as the second candidate in the Frente de Todos list, behind Mario Leito. The list received 51.9% of the vote, and both Leito and Carrizo were elected.

During her 2019–2023 term, Carrizo formed part of the parliamentary commissions on Pensions and Social Security, Families and Childhood, Education, Elderly People, Science and Technology, Social Action and Public Health, and Sports. She was also a supporter of the 2020 Voluntary Interruption of Pregnancy bill, which legalized abortion in Argentina.

References

External links
Profile on the official website of the Chamber of Deputies (in Spanish)

Living people
1979 births
Politicians from Buenos Aires
People from Tucumán Province
Members of the Argentine Chamber of Deputies elected in Tucumán
Women members of the Argentine Chamber of Deputies
Justicialist Party politicians
Members of La Cámpora
21st-century Argentine politicians
21st-century Argentine women politicians